Musan Kwangsan station is a railway station in Musan County, North Hamgyŏng Province, North Korea. It is the terminus of the freight-only Musan Mining Line of the Korean State Railway's Musan Line.

History
The station, together with the line, was opened in 1971 by the Korean State Railway.

Services
Magnetite from the Musan Mining Complex destined for the Kim Chaek Steel Complex, the Ch'ŏngjin Steel Works, the Sŏngjin Steel Complex and for Namyang station for export to China, is loaded onto trains at this station.

References

Railway stations in North Korea
1971 establishments in North Korea
Railway stations opened in 1971